The Snow Creature is a 1954 American science fiction-horror film produced and directed by W. Lee Wilder, for Planet Filmplays Inc., written by Myles Wilder, and starring Paul Langton.

Plot 
In an undisclosed Himalayan country (presumably bordering India), Dr. Frank Parrish leads a scientific expedition intent on collecting botanical samples. He encounters difficulties when the wife of the expedition's chief guide is kidnapped.

The guide, a sherpa named Subra, seizes the expedition's guns and takes control of the team when he is unable to convince Parrish to pursue the Yeti and save his wife. Parrish, a man of science, is skeptical of the Yeti's existence, but is forced to participate in Subra's march. Along with his fellow westerner, a photographer named Peter Wells, Parrish awaits his opportunity to overthrow the renegade sherpa. However, as the team draws closer to the Yeti, evidence emerges that begins to change Parrish's opinion regarding the creature's existence.

Finally, the team makes contact with the snow creature, who hurls stones at them from atop his mountain refuge. The expedition tracks the creature to his cave, where they encounter it, along with two other Yetis- a female and young one. Parrish forcibly prevents the enraged Subra from shooting the Yeti, reasoning that the creature is more valuable for science alive. The ensuing fight creates a cave-in.

The cave-in kills the female and young Yetis and knocks the snow creature unconscious. The cave-in also enables Parrish and Wells to take control of the sherpa's guns. Having regained control over the expedition and successfully capturing a live Yeti, Parrish declares that he intends to bring the creature to the U.S. to study it.

The Yeti is eventually sedated and placed in a telephone booth-sized freezer for transport. Locked inside this freezer, the Yeti is transported to Bombay and thence to California. Upon reaching Los Angeles, Parrish is greeted by reporters who have been made aware of the creature's existence.

A U.S. Customs official informs Parrish that the admission of this creature to the U.S. has been made difficult by a newspaper article published by Wells that refers to the creature using the term “man”. The issue is raised whether the snow creature is actually human, and the officials decide to keep the creature in quarantine until an anthropologist can determine the question of the creature's humanity. It is during this delay at the airport's customs station that the snow creature manages to escape the icebox (which was apparently meant to confine him temporarily only).

The snow creature roams the city, terrorizing a woman and finding refuge in the cool temperature of the city's sewers as well as meat lockers (where it can also feed). The police, aided by Parrish, manage to track the Yeti through the sewer system to where the creature is caught in a net and grabbed by five men. As the creature resists, it starts to choke one of the men through the mesh. One of the men shoots the creature once, who then stops choking the man. There is a pause after the choked man had been released and then the man with the gun decides to shoot the rare creature with three more slugs just for good measure. Thus, one of the greatest finds of all time is dead.

Cast 

 Paul Langton as Frank Parrish
 Leslie Denison as Peter Wells
 Teru Shimada as Subra
 William Phipps as Lt. Dunbar
 Lock Martin as the Yeti

 Rollin Moriyama as Leva
 Robert Kino as Inspector Karma
 George Douglas as Corey Jr.
 Rudolf Anders as Dr. Louis DuPont

Production 

The Snow Creature was one of the first of several Yeti/Abominable Snowman-themed movies.  It also bore some resemblance to King Kong in terms of plot, with act one in an exotic setting, and act two taking place in an urban setting. The use of the Los Angeles storm drain system as the film's climactic setting can also be seen in the 1954 film, Them.

The first half of the movie takes place in an undisclosed Himalayan country (presumably bordering India), but the actors portraying the locals speak Japanese. Another geographic improbability occurs with the return flight the main characters take, which heads west from India to California (via TWA).

Reception 

Film critic Leonard Maltin awarded the film one and a half out of a possible four stars, calling it "dull".
The film was featured in an episode of Deadly Cinema.
TV Guide's review on the film was particularly scathing: "Billy Wilder's talentless brother put together this fourth-rate Abominable Snowman film (the first and the worst)". The reviewer also called the film's monster costume "phony".

References

External links 
 
 
 

1954 films
1954 horror films
1950s monster movies
American science fiction horror films
Bigfoot films
Films set in India
United Artists films
Films about Yeti
Films directed by W. Lee Wilder
1950s science fiction horror films
American black-and-white films
1950s English-language films
1950s American films